Little Memphis Blues Orchestra (also known as L.M.B.O. or LiMBO) is the band formerly known as the Taylor Hicks Band. Taylor Hicks assembled the band about two years before he won American Idol in 2006. The band was initially formed in Alabama, but has since based themselves throughout the Southern United States, and later (after American Idol), nationwide. The band features Brian Less on keyboard/piano/vocals, Sam Gunderson on lead guitar/vocals, Mitch Jones on bass guitar, Zippy Dietrich on drums/vocals, and Jeff Lopez on saxophone/backing vocals.

The band toured the United States during the American Idol concert tour, playing numerous after-parties which sometimes featured Hicks on stage, along with Hicks' friends and fellow American Idol finalists, Elliott Yamin, Ace Young, Bucky Covington , and Chris Daughtry (they, along with Hicks, made up the top five men).  One of the LiMBO "after-party" concerts was at WorkPlay Theatre in Taylor Hicks and LiMBO's hometown of Birmingham.  This concert was the night of the Birmingham stop of the American Idol tour and Hicks, Yamin, Young, and Covington appeared with the band.  The entire performance was recorded on both audio and video.  LiMBO has since released both a DVD and a CD version of that performance.
 
The LiMBO name has a double meaning. As Taylor Hicks gained fame during the American Idol competition, the remaining members of the Taylor Hicks Band continued to play professionally. To ensure no one assumed that Taylor Hicks would appear with the band, they decided on a name change. The keyboard player, Brian Less, is originally from Memphis, Tennessee and is not that tall; Taylor Hicks (who played basketball in high school) and Sam Gunderson are tall men, so it especially showed since Less, Hicks, and Gunderson were the front men for the band. Less than acquired the nickname of "Little Memphis". The other meaning was that the band was in limbo, not knowing when or if Hicks would return.

References

American country rock groups
American contemporary R&B musical groups
Rock music groups from Alabama